Murfreesboro is a city in, and county seat of, Rutherford County, Tennessee, United States. The population was 152,769 according to the 2020 census, up from 108,755 residents certified in 2010.

Serving as the state capital from 1818 to 1826, it was superseded by Nashville. Today, it is the largest suburb of Nashville and the sixth-largest city in Tennessee. The city is both the center of population and the geographic center of Tennessee.

Since the 1990s, Murfreesboro has been Tennessee's fastest-growing major city and one of the fastest-growing cities in the country. Murfreesboro is home to Middle Tennessee State University, the largest undergraduate university in the state of Tennessee, with 22,729 total students as of fall 2014.

History

On October 27, 1811, the Tennessee General Assembly designated the location for a new county seat for Rutherford County, giving it the name Cannonsburgh in honor of Newton Cannon, representative to the Assembly for the local area. At the suggestion of William Lytle, it was renamed Murfreesborough on November 29, 1811, after Revolutionary War hero Colonel Hardy Murfree. The name was shortened to Murfreesboro in January 1812 when the town was formally chartered. Author Mary Noailles Murfree was his great-granddaughter.

As Tennessee settlement expanded to the west, the location of the state capital in Knoxville became inconvenient for much of the population. In 1818, Murfreesboro was designated as the capital of Tennessee and its population boomed. Eight years later, however, it was superseded by Nashville.

Civil War
On December 31, 1862, the Battle of Stones River, also called the Battle of Murfreesboro, was fought near the city between the Union Army of the Cumberland and the Confederate Army of Tennessee. This was a major engagement of the American Civil War, and between December 31 and January 2, 1863, the rival armies suffered a combined total of 23,515 casualties. It was the bloodiest battle of the war by percentage of casualties.

Following the Confederate retreat after the drawn Battle of Perryville in central Kentucky, the Confederate army moved through East Tennessee and turned northwest to defend Murfreesboro. General Braxton Bragg's veteran cavalry successfully harassed Union General William Rosecrans troop movements, capturing and destroying many of his supply trains. However, they could not completely prevent supplies and reinforcements from reaching Rosecrans. Despite the large number of casualties, the battle was inconclusive. Even so, the Union army did not move against Bragg until six months later, in June 1863. The battle was significant since the Union gained a base from which it could push its eventual drive further south, which enabled its later advances against Chattanooga and Atlanta. The Union eventually divided the territory into the Eastern and Western theaters, followed by Sherman's March to the Sea through the South. The Stones River National Battlefield is now a national historical site.

General Rosecrans' move to the south depended on a secure source of provisions, and Murfreesboro was chosen for his supply depot. Fortress Rosecrans consisted of eight lunettes, four redoubts, and connecting fortifications. The fortress was built around the Nashville and Chattanooga Railroad and the West Fork of the Stones River; two roads provided additional access and transportation.

The fort's interior was a huge logistical resource center, including sawmills, warehouses, quartermaster maintenance depots, ammunition magazines, and living quarters for the 2,000 men who handled the operations and defended the post. After the fortress was completed in June 1863, Rosecrans ventured to the south. The fortress was never attacked, in part because the Union troops held the town of Murfreesboro hostage by training their artillery on the courthouse. Major portions of the earthworks still exist and have been incorporated into the battlefield historic site.

Post-Civil War
Murfreesboro was first developed as a mainly agricultural community, but by 1853 the area was home to several colleges and academies, gaining the nickname the "Athens of Tennessee". Despite the wartime trauma, the town's growth had begun to recover by the early 1900s, in contrast to other areas of the devastated South.

In 1911, the state legislature created Middle Tennessee State Normal School, a two-year institute to train teachers. It soon merged with the Tennessee College for Women. In 1925 the Normal School was expanded to a full, four-year curriculum and college. With additional expansion of programs and addition of graduate departments, in 1965 it became Middle Tennessee State University. MTSU now has the largest undergraduate enrollment in the state, including many international students.

World War II was an impetus for industrial development, and Murfreesboro diversified into industry, manufacturing, and education. Growth has been steady since that time, creating a stable economy.

Since the last decade of the 20th century, Murfreesboro has enjoyed substantial residential and commercial growth, with its population increasing 123.9% between 1990 and 2010, from 44,922 to 108,755. The city has been a destination for many refugee immigrants who have left areas affected by warfare; since 1990 numerous people from Somalia and Kurds from Iraq have settled there. The city has also attracted numerous international students to the university.

Geography

Murfreesboro is the geographic center of the state of Tennessee.

The West Fork of the Stones River flows through Murfreesboro. A walking trail, the Greenway, parallels the river for several miles. A smaller waterway, Lytle Creek, flows through downtown including historic Cannonsburgh Village.

Murfreesboro is home to a number of natural and man-made lakes plus several small wetlands including Todd's Lake and the Murfree Spring wetland area.

Murfreesboro has been in the path of destructive tornados several times. On April 10, 2009, a low-end EF4 tornado with estimated windspeeds up to 170 miles per hour struck the fringes of Murfreesboro. As a result, two people were killed and 41 others injured. 117 homes were totally destroyed, and 292 had major damage. The tornado is estimated to have caused over $40 million in damage.

Climate
Being in the Sun Belt, Murfreesboro's climate is humid subtropical (Cfa) under the Köppen system, with mild winters and hot, humid summers. Under the Trewartha system, it is an oceanic (Do) climate due to five months of winter chill (monthly means below 10 °C (50 °F)); however, Murfreesboro is close to being humid subtropical (Cf) even under Trewartha (March falls 0.9 °F (0.5 °C) short of the threshold), supported by the fact that subtropical plants like Southern magnolia trees and the occasional dwarf palmetto and needle palm shrubs can thrive long-term there but struggle much further north. Temperatures range from a record low of -19 °F (-28 °C) on January 26, 1940 to a record high of 109 °F (43 °C) on August 16, 1954. Precipitation is abundant year-round without any major difference, but there is still slight variation. The wet season runs from February through July, reaching its zenith in June with 144 mm of rain. The dry season runs from August through January with a September nadir of 88 mm and secondary December peak of 141 mm.

Demographics

2020 census

As of the 2020 United States census, there were 152,769 people, 52,530 households, and 31,732 families residing in the city.

As of the 2010 census, there were 108,755 people living in the city. The racial makeup of the city was 75.62% White, 15.18% Black / African American, 0.35% Native American, 3.36% Asian, 0.04% Pacific Islander, 2.79% from other races, and 2.65% from two or more races. Hispanic or Latino of any race were 5.93% of the population.

In the 2000 Census, There were 26,511 households, out of which 30.7% had children under the age of 18 living with them, 43.8% were married couples living together, 11.9% had a female householder with no husband present, and 40.6% were non-families. 28.3% of all households were made up of individuals, and 7.0% had someone living alone who was 65 years of age or older. The average household size was 2.42 and the average family size was 3.02.

In the city, the population was spread out, with 22.7% under the age of 18, 20.5% from 18 to 24, 30.8% from 25 to 44, 17.3% from 45 to 64, and 8.8% who were 65 years of age or older. The median age was 29 years. For every 100 females, there were 98.7 males. For every 100 females age 18 and over, there were 97.2 males.

The median income for a household in the city was $39,705, and the median income for a family was $52,654. Males had a median income of $36,078 versus $26,531 for females. The per capita income for the city was $20,219. About 8.2% of families and 14.1% of the population were below the poverty line, including 12.0% of those under the age of 18 and 11.1% of those 65 and older.

Special census estimates in 2005 indicated 81,393 residents, and in 2006 the U.S. Census Bureau's American Community Survey estimated a population of 92,559, with 35,842 households and 20,979 families in the city. Murfreesboro's 2008 special census reported that the population had reached 100,575, while preliminary information from the 2010 U.S. Census indicates a population of 108,755. In October 2017, the City of Murfreesboro started another special census. Given the continuous growth in the general area, the population is expected to exceed the 2016 estimate of 131,947. According to Money.com in 2018, 136,000 people called Murfreesboro home and it would see a nearly 10% expansion of jobs in the coming years.

Economy

Top employers
According to Murfreesboro's 2018 Comprehensive Annual Financial Report, the top employers in Rutherford County are:

Arts and culture

Music
Murfreesboro hosts several music-oriented events annually, such as the Main Street Jazzfest presented by MTSU's School of Music and the Main Street Association each May. For over 30 years, Uncle Dave Macon Days has celebrated the musical tradition of Uncle Dave Macon. This annual July event includes national competitions for old-time music and dancing.

Murfreesboro also hosts an annual DIY not-for-profit music festival called Boro Fondo, which is also a bike tour and local artist feature.

Arts
The Murfreesboro Center for the Arts, close to the Square, entertains with a variety of exhibits, theatre arts, concerts, dances, and magic shows. Murfreesboro Little Theatre has provided the community with popular and alternative forms of theatre arts since 1962.

Murfreesboro's International FolkFest began in 1982 and is held annually during the second week in June. Groups from countries spanning the globe participate in the festival, performing traditional songs and dances while attired in regional apparel.

Museums
The Discovery Center at Murfree Spring is a nature center and interactive museum focusing on children and families. The facility includes  of wetlands with a variety of animals.

Bradley Academy Museum contains collectibles and exhibits of the first school in Rutherford County. This school was later renovated to become the only African American school in Murfreesboro, which closed in 1955.

The Stones River National Battlefield is a national park which memorializes the Battle of Stones River, which took place during the American Civil War during December 31, 1862, to January 3, 1863. The grounds include a museum, a national cemetery, monuments, and the remains of a large earthen fortification called Fortress Rosecrans.

Oaklands Historic House Museum is a 19th-century mansion which became involved in the Civil War. It was occupied as a residence until the 1950s, after which it was purchased by the City of Murfreesboro and renovated into a museum by the Oaklands Association.

Earth Experience: The Middle Tennessee Museum of Natural History is the only natural history museum in Middle Tennessee. The museum opened in September 2014 and features more than 2,000 items on display, including a complete replica Tyrannosaurus rex skeleton.

Shopping
There are two main malls located within the city limits. Stones River Mall is a traditional enclosed mall, featuring stores and restaurants such as  Forever 21, Aéropostale, Journey's, Hot Topic, Agaci, Dillard's, Buckle, Books-A-Million, Olive Garden, and Miller's Ale House.

The Avenue Murfreesboro is an outdoor lifestyle center with such shops as American Eagle, Hollister, Best Buy, Belk, Petco, Dick's Sporting Goods, Express, Mimi's Cafe, Romano's Macaroni Grill, and LongHorn Steakhouse.

The Historic Downtown Murfreesboro district also offers a wide variety of shopping and dining experiences that encircle the pre-Civil War Courthouse.

Points of interest
 Discovery Center at Murfree Spring
 Geographic center of Tennessee
 Middle Tennessee State University
 Oaklands Historic House Museum
 Stones River Greenway Arboretum
 Stones River National Battlefield
 Cannonsburgh Village
 Bill Rice Ranch

Murfreesboro is the home of a Consolidated Mail Outpatient Pharmacy (CMOP). It is part of an initiative by the Department of Veterans Affairs to provide mail order prescriptions to veterans using computerization at strategic locations throughout the United States. It is located on the campus of the Alvin C. York Veterans Hospital.

The City Center building (also known as the Swanson Building) is the tallest building in Murfreesboro. Located in the downtown area it was built by Joseph Swanson in 1989. As a commercial building its tenants include Bank of America and is the headquarters for the National Healthcare Corporation (NHC).

Parks and recreation
Cannonsburgh Village is a reproduction of what a working pioneer village would have looked like from the period of the 1830s to the 1930s. Visitors can view the grist mill, school house, doctor's office, Leeman House, Caboose, Wedding Chapel, and other points of interest. It is also home to the World's Largest Cedar Bucket.

Old Fort Park is a  park which includes baseball fields, tennis courts, children's playground, an 18-hole championship golf course, picnic shelters and bike trail.

Barfield Crescent Park is a  facility with eight baseball fields,  of biking/running trails, an 18-hole championship disc golf course, and ten picnic shelters.

In 2013, the city council approved a controversial 25-year "master plan" to extend the system by adding 173 miles worth of new greenways, bikeways and blueways at an estimated cost of $104.8 million.

Government
The city council has six members, all elected at-large for four-year terms, on staggered schedules with elections every two years. The mayor is also elected at large. City council members have responsibilities for various city departments.

 Joshua Haskell, 1818
 David Wendel, 1819
 Robert Purdy, 1820
 Henry Holmes, 1821
 W. R. Rucker, 1822-1823
 John Jones, 1824
 Wm. Ledbetter, 1825, 1827
 John Smith, 1828, 1830
 Edward Fisher, 1829, 1836, 1839
 James C. Moore, 1831
 Charles Ready, 1832
 Charles Niles, 1833
 Marman Spence, 1834
 M. Spence, 1835
 L. H. Carney, 1837
 Edwin Augustus Keeble, 1838, 1855
 G. A. Sublett, 1840
 B. W. Farmer, 1841–1842, 1845-1846
 Henderson King Yoakum, 1843
 Wilson Thomas, 1844
 John Leiper, 1847-1848
 Charles Ready, 1849–1853, 1867
 F. Henry, 1854
 Joseph B. Palmer, 1856-1859
 John W. Burton, 1860-1861
 John E. Dromgoole, 1862
 James Monro Tompkins, 1863-1864
 R. D. Reed, 1865-1866
 E. L. Jordan, 1868-1869
 Thomas B. Darragh, 1870
 Joseph A. January, 1871
 I. B. Collier, 1872-1873
 J. B. Murfree, 1874-1875
 H. H. Kerr, 1876
 H. H. Clayton, 1877
 N. C. Collier, 1878-1879
 Jas. Clayton, 1880-1881
 E. F. Burton, 1882-1883
 J. M. Overall, 1884-1885
 H. E. Palmer, 1886-1887
 Tom H. Woods, 1888-1895
 J. T. Wrather, 1896-1897
 J. O. Oslin, 1898-1899
 J. H. Chrichlow, 1900-1909
 G. B. Giltner, 1910-1918
 N. C. Maney, 1919–1922, 1932-1934
 Al D. McKnight, 1923-1931
 W. T. Gerhardt, 1934–1936, 1941-1942
 W. A. Miles, 1937–1940, 1943-1946
 John T. Holloway, 1947-1950
 Jennings A. Jones, 1951-1954
 A. L. Todd, Jr., 1955-1964
 William Hollis Westbrooks, 1965-1982
 Joe B. Jackson, 1982-1998
 Richard Reeves, 1998-2002
 Tommy Bragg, 2002-2014
 Shane McFarland, 2014–present

Education
Elementary education within the city is overseen by Murfreesboro City Schools (MCS). MCS focuses on prekindergarten through sixth grade learning. The city has 12 schools serving 8,800 students between grades pre-K through 6th.

Secondary schools are overseen by Rutherford County Schools, which has 50 schools and a student population of over 49,000.

The Japanese Supplementary School in Middle Tennessee (JSMT, 中部テネシー日本語補習校 Chūbu Teneshī Nihongo Hoshūkō), a weekend Japanese education program, holds its classes in Peck Hall at Middle Tennessee State University, while its school offices are in Jefferson Square.

Media

Murfreesboro is serviced by the following media outlets:

Newspapers:
The Daily News Journal
The Murfreesboro Post
The Murfreesboro Pulse
Sidelines – MTSU student newspaper
Rutherford Source
The Sword of the Lord

Radio:
WGNS – Talk radio
WMOT – MTSU public radio station
WMTS-FM – MTSU free-form student-run station
WRHW-LP - 3ABN Radio Christian

TV:
City TV Murfreesboro, Channel 3 – Government-access television channel
MT10, Channel 10 – MTSU student-run educational-access television channel

Infrastructure

Transportation
Murfreesboro is served by Nashville International Airport (IATA code BNA), Smyrna Airport (MQY) and Murfreesboro Municipal Airport (MBT). The city also benefits from several highways running through the city, including Interstates 24 and 840; U.S. Routes 41, 70S, and 231; and State Routes 1, 2, 10, 96, 99, and 268.

Industry also has access to north–south rail service with the rail line from Nashville to Chattanooga. Into the latter 1940s the Nashville, Chattanooga & St. Louis Railway's #3/#4 (Memphis - Nashville - Atlanta) served Murfreesboro. By 1950 that train's route was shortened to Nashville - Atlanta. Until 1965 the Louisville & Nashville's Dixie Flyer (Chicago - Florida) made a stop in the town on its route. Likewise, the #3/#2 (renumbered from #3/4) continued to that period as an overnight train between Nashville and Atlanta, also making a stop in town.

Public transportation
In April 2007 the City of Murfreesboro established a public transportation system with nine small buses, each capable of holding sixteen people and including two spaces for wheelchairs. The system is called Rover; the buses are bright green with Rover and a cartoon dog painted on the side. , buses operate in six major corridors: Memorial Boulevard, Gateway, Old Fort Parkway, South Church Street, Highland Avenue and Mercury Boulevard.

The system operates Monday to Friday, 6:00 a.m. to 6:00 p.m.

Notable people
Jerry Anderson (1953–1989), football player
Rankin Barbee (1874–1958), journalist and author
Ronnie Barrett (born 1954), firearms manufacturer
Rex Brothers (born 1987), Major League Baseball pitcher, currently on the Chicago Cubs
James M. Buchanan (1919–2013), economist
Bryan M. Clayton - businessman and real estate investor,  CEO and cofounder of GreenPal
Reno Collier, stand-up comedian
Crystal Dangerfield (born 1998), Minnesota Lynx point guard
Colton Dixon (born 1991), singer
Will Allen Dromgoole, (1860–1934), author and poet
Harold Earthman (1900–1987), politician
Mary Ann Eckles (born 1947), politician
Corn Elder (born 1994), football player
Jeff Givens (died 2013), horse trainer
Bart Gordon (born 1949), politician and lawyer
Joe Black Hayes (1915–2013), football player
James Sanders Holman (1804-1867), 1st mayor of Houston, Texas
Montori Hughes (born 1990), football player
Yolanda Hughes-Heying (born 1963), professional female bodybuilder
Robert James (born 1947), football player
Marshall Keeble (1878–1962), African American preacher
Muhammed Lawal (born 1981), mixed martial artist
Mike Liles (1945-2022), businessman and politician
Sondra Locke (1944–2018), actress and director
Andrew Nelson Lytle (1902–1995), novelist, dramatist, essayist and professor
Jean MacArthur (1898–2000), wife of U.S. Army General of the Army Douglas MacArthur
Bayer Mack (born 1972), filmmaker, journalist and founder of Block Starz Music.
Matt Mahaffey (born 1973), record producer and recording engineer
Philip D. McCulloch Jr. (1851–1928), politician
Ridley McLean (1872–1933), United States Navy Rear Admiral
Judith Ann Neelley (born 1964), double murderer
William Northcott (1854-1917), lieutenant governor of Illinois
Andre Alice Norton (1912-2005), author of science fiction and fantasy
Joseph B. Palmer (1825–1890), lawyer, legislator, and soldier
Sarah Childress Polk (1803–1891), First Lady of the United States
Patrick Porter, singer-songwriter
David Price (born 1985), Major League Baseball pitcher
Grantland Rice (1880–1954), iconic sportswriter, journalist and poet
Mary Scales (1928–2013), professor and civic leader
Robert W. Scales (1926–2000), Vice-Mayor of Murfreesboro
Margaret Rhea Seddon (born 1947), NASA astronaut
Adam Smith (born 1990), Arena Football League player
Chuck Taylor (born 1942), Major League Baseball relief pitcher
Chris Young (born 1985), country music artist
Audrey Whitby (born 1996), actress

Notable bands

Mosque controversy

Beginning in 2010, the Islamic Center of Murfreesboro faced protests related to its plan to build a new  mosque. The county planning council had approved the project, but opposition grew in the aftermath, affected by this being a year of elections. Signs on the building site were vandalized, with the first saying "not welcome" sprayed across it and the second being cut in two. Construction equipment was also torched by arsonists.

In August 2011, a Rutherford County judge upheld his previous decision allowing the mosque to be built, noting the US constitutional right to religious freedom and the ICM's observance of needed process. The center has a permanent membership of around 250 families and a few hundred students from the university. The case ultimately attracted national media attention as an issue of religious freedom.

See also

Blackman, Tennessee
Boxwood (Murfreesboro, Tennessee)
Barrett Firearms Manufacturing
First Presbyterian Church (Murfreesboro, Tennessee)
Murfreesboro Musicians
Murphy Center
Evergreen Cemetery

References

Bibliography

External links

 
Daily News Journal (newspaper)
Murfreesboro Post (newspaper)

 
Cities in Tennessee
Cities in Rutherford County, Tennessee
County seats in Tennessee
Tennessee
Cities in Nashville metropolitan area
Populated places established in 1811
1811 establishments in Tennessee